Steve Baumann was a U.S. soccer forward who is the Chief Executive of the National Soccer Hall of Fame.  He was a first team All American at the University of Pennsylvania before playing three seasons in the North American Soccer League.  He later coached the Penn soccer team for six seasons.

Player
Baumann attended Staples High School in Westport, Connecticut where he was a two time All Conference high school soccer player.  In 1967, Baumann's sophomore season, Staples won the state championship.  In 1969 Staples again took the title, this time on a game winning header by Baumann.  He graduated in 1970.  He then attended the University of Pennsylvania, playing on the men's soccer team from 1971 to 1973.  He holds the school's record for career points with 99 and career assists with 39.  He was a 1973 first team All American. In 2005, he was named to the Penn All Century Team.  In 1971, Baumann played one season with the Penn football team as a placekicker.  He graduated with a bachelor's degree in elementary education and later earned a master's degree in science education at the University of Virginia.  In 1973, the Miami Toros of the North American Soccer League selected Baumann in the first round of the NASL College Draft.  He spent three seasons in Miami.

Coach
After retiring from playing professionally, Baumann became an elementary school teacher in the Fairfax County Public School system where he taught from 1977 to 1987.  During this time, he began coaching at the high school level first at Madison High School and then Robinson Secondary School where his team were state runners up in 1987.   Baumann was also an instructor in science education and educational technology at George Mason University and Rosemont College.  He then coached at the University of Pennsylvania from 1987 to 1993.  He finished his six seasons with a 29–51–10 record.

Executive
Baumann has held a number of executive positions including the Vice President of Education and Programs at the Liberty Science Center and the Director of Educational Technology Programs at The Franklin Institute Science Museum.  In 2004, he became the Executive Director of the Kidspace Children's Museum in Pasadena, California.  On May 11, 2007, Baumann became the President and Chief Operating Officer of the National Soccer Hall of Fame. He is married to Karen Baumann and has two children.

References

External links
World Soccer Society
NASL stats

American soccer players
North American Soccer League (1968–1984) players
North American Soccer League (1968–1984) indoor players
Miami Toros players
Penn Quakers men's soccer players
Curry School of Education alumni
Penn Quakers men's soccer coaches
Penn Quakers football players
American football placekickers
Directors of museums in the United States
George Mason University faculty
Rosemont College
Living people
1952 births
University of Pennsylvania alumni
All-American men's college soccer players
Association football forwards
Staples High School alumni
American soccer coaches
Soccer players from Connecticut
Players of American football from Connecticut
People from Westport, Connecticut
Sportspeople from Fairfield County, Connecticut
High school soccer coaches in the United States
University of Virginia alumni